Vicco District is one of thirteen districts of the province Pasco in Peru.

See also 
 Upamayu Dam
 Vicco Airport

References